Future Past is the debut and only solo studio album to be released by Blue singer Duncan James.

Background
James' solo career began in October 2004, when he collaborated with singer-songwriter Keedie on the single "I Believe My Heart", which was a number-two hit on the UK Singles Chart. Shortly after, James began recording a solo album, with the help of producer Stephen Lipson, who had collaborated with the likes of Boyzone, Ronan Keating, Daniel Bedingfield and Will Young. The album was released on 12 June 2006, a week after the release of the lead single, "Sooner or Later", which only peaked at #35 on the UK Singles Chart. Upon the week of release, the album only peaked at #55 on the UK Albums Chart. In an attempt to boost sales, "Can't Stop a River" was released as the album's second single on 21 August 2006 but this charted even lower than "Sooner or Later", only peaking at #59 on the UK Singles Chart.

It was heavily speculated at the time that James would be dropped from the label, until January 2007, when the music video for the album's third single, "Amazed", premiered on music channels throughout Europe. However, once again, the single's release failed to gain interest from the media and fans alike, and the single's release was cancelled in the United Kingdom, becoming a German-only release. Overall, the album sold less than 15,000 copies in the United Kingdom, and less than 150,000 copies worldwide. However, it found success in Italy, peaking at #2 on the Italian Albums Chart, for sales of more than 80,000 copies.

Critical reception

Sharon Mawer of Allmusic gave the album two out of five stars, stating: "Despite having high hopes after the success of Simon Webbe and Lee Ryan's solo careers, and having a hit single already behind him, Duncan James' "Future Past" was doomed from the outset after the poor performances of the lead singles "Sooner or Later" and "Can't Stop a River", despite the latter being backed by the writing talents of Seal. Every one of the twelve songs fails to break the mid-tempo ballad barrier, with only "Letter to God" being an out-and-out slow ballad. There is definitely a need for greater contrast and stronger imagination, something which this album clearly lacks." Talia Kraines from BBC Music found that Future Past "isn't an album full of exciting pop songs to get your blood rushing, but if you're missing Darius and after a bunch of mid-tempo pop songs to ease you through the day then this might just be it [...] Claiming serious pop writers such as Stephen Lipson and Peter Vetesse on his album notes, Duncan's younger fans should stay well away. He's no longer your pin up – but your mum's."

Track listing

Charts

Certifications

References

2006 debut albums
Albums produced by Stephen Lipson
Pop albums by English artists